The 2013 Esso Cup was Canada's fifth annual national women's midget hockey championship, played April 21–27, 2013 at the Bill Copeland Sports Centre in Burnaby, British Columbia. The LHFDQ North squad captured Quebec's first national title with a victory over Ontario's North Bay Ice Boltz in the gold medal game. The Edmonton Thunder captured a medal for the fourth consecutive year by winning the bronze.

Teams

Round robin

Standings

Scores
 North Bay 3 - Metro 0
 Regina 5 - LHFDQ North 2
 Edmonton 4 - Fraser Valley 2
 North Bay 2 - Regina 1 (SO)
 Edmonton 4 - Metro 1
 LHFDQ North 5 - Fraser Valley 1
 LHFDQ North 8 - Metro 1
 Edmonton 5 - North Bay 4 (SO)
 Regina 5 - Fraser Valley 1
 LHFDQ North 3 - North Bay 1
 Edmonton 5 - Regina 4 (OT)
 Fraser Valley 3 - Metro 1
 LHFDQ North 3 - Edmonton 2
 Regina 2 - Metro 1
 North Bay 1 - Fraser Valley 0

Playoffs

Individual awards
 Most Valuable Player: Mikaeli Cavell (Edmonton)
 Top Scorer: Valérie Audet (LHFDQ North)
 Top Forward: Jade Downie-Landry (LHFDQ North)
 Top Defenceman: Corie Jacobson (North Bay)
 Top Goaltender: Sabrina Picard (North Bay)
 Most Sportsmanlike Player: Jodie Gentile (Fraser Valley)

Road to the Esso Cup

Atlantic Region
Tournament held April 4 – 7 at the Pictou Wellness Center in Pictou, Nova Scotia.

Metro advances to Esso Cup

Quebec
Dodge Cup played April 4 – 5, 2013 at Boucherville, Québec.

LHFDQ North advances to Esso Cup.

Ontario
Ontario Women's Hockey Association Championship played April 4 – 7, 2013 at Ottawa, Ontario.

North Bay advances to Esso Cup.

Western Region
Best-of-3 series played April 5 – 7, 2013 in Morden, Manitoba

Regina advances to Esso Cup.

Pacific Region
Fraser Valley Phantom vs Edmonton Thunder.

Edmonton automatically qualifies for Esso Cup as Fraser Valley is host team.

''Pacific champion determined by 2013 Esso Cup round robin match on April 21, 2013.

See also
 Esso Cup

References

External links
 Hockey Canada-Esso Cup Guide and Record Book
 2013 Esso Cup Home Page at HockeyCanada.com
 Atlantic Female Midget Hockey Championship Website

Esso Cup
Esso Cup
Sport in Burnaby